Chance is a census-designated place (CDP) in Adair County, Oklahoma, United States. Within the Cherokee Nation, it was first listed as a CDP prior to the 2020 census.

The CDP is in northern Adair County, along Chewey Road, which leads east  to U.S. Route 59 between Watts and Westville, and northwest  to Chewey.

Demographics

References 

Census-designated places in Adair County, Oklahoma
Census-designated places in Oklahoma